Tupoumālohi (born sometime in the 18th century, died 1812) was the 16th Tui Kanokupolu of Tonga from the death of his uncle Maafuolimuloa, the 15th Tui Kanokupolu on 22 April 1799, until his own death in 1812.

According to:
His installation took place on May 29, 1799 at the Pangai Green in Kolovai in Hihifo (Tongatapu). He established his capital at Nukualofa, the current Tongan capital. He died on Haapai in 1812.

According to more established scholars:
Exact date of installation unknown, probably somewhere around 1808 in Mua. Left office within the year.
Defended without success a great fort in Nukualofa against Fīnau Ulukālala II in 1807. (Nukualofa in that time was a small settlement, it would not be made capital of Tonga until 1851 by Tāufaāhau, but it was already the residence of the Tui Kanokupolu chiefs since Mumui around 1795).

References and notes

 I.C. Campbell; Classical Tongan kingship; 1989
 E. Bott; Tonga society at the time of Captain Cook's visit; 1982
 S. Lātūkefu; Church and State in Tonga; 1974

18th-century births
1812 deaths
Tongan monarchs
People from Tongatapu